is a city located in Saga Prefecture on the island of Kyushu, Japan. Imari is most notable because of Imari porcelain, which is the European collectors' name for Japanese porcelain wares made in the town of Arita, Saga Prefecture. The porcelain was exported from the port of Imari specifically for the European export trade. As of October 1, 2016, the city has an estimated population of 54,907 and a population density of 220 persons per km2. The total area is 254.99 km2.

Geography
Imari is located in the western part of Saga Prefecture. The city center is located around the mouth of the Imari River.
Mountains: Mt. Hachiman (764 m), Mt. Seira (599 m), Mt. Eboshi (597 m)
Rivers: Matsuura River, Imari River, Hata River, Kurōtake River, Arita River

Adjoining municipalities
Saga Prefecture
Arita
Karatsu
Takeo
Nagasaki Prefecture
Sasebo
Matsuura

Climate

History

During the Edo period this region flourished due to the export of ceramics and porcelain. High quality goods to be presented to Shōgun and the Imperial Court were produced in what is now called Ōkawachiyama. From the Meiji period to 1955 coal was also a major export.
August 15, 1281 - The 2nd Mongol invasion fleet retreated into Imari Bay and was destroyed here by Kamikaze typhoon.
April 1, 1889 - The modern municipal system was established. The current city region was occupied by one town (Imari), and 11 villages (Higashiyamashiro, Kurokawa, Makishima, Matsuura, Minamihata, Niri, Nishiyamashiro, Ōdake, Ōkawa, Ōkawachi and Ōtsubo).
February 16, 1901 - Ōdake Village was renamed Hatatsu Village.
December 10, 1928 - Makishima Village was incorporated into Imari Town.
April 1, 1936 - Nishiyamashiro Village became Yamashiro Town.
December 8, 1943 - The villages of Ōkawachi and Ōtsubo were incorporated into Imari Town.
April 1, 1954 - The towns of Imari and Yamashiro, and the villages of Higashiyamashiro, Kurokawa, Hatatsu, Minamihata, Ōkawa, Matsuura, and Niri were merged to create Imari City.

Education

Vocational schools
Imari College of Nursing

High schools
Saga Prefectural Imari High School (佐賀県立伊万里高等学校)
Saga Prefectural Imari Agriculture and Forestry High School (佐賀県立伊万里農林高等学校)
Saga Prefectural Imari Business High School (佐賀県立伊万里商業高等学校)
Keitoku High School (敬徳高等学校)

Transportation

Air
The nearest airports are Saga Airport, Fukuoka Airport, and Nagasaki Airport.

Rail
JR Kyushu
Chikuhi Line
Komanaki Station - Ōkawano Station - Hizen-Nagano Station - Momonokawa Station - Kanaishihara Station - Kami-Imari Station - Imari Station
Matsuura Railway
Nishi-Kyūshū Line
Kanatake Station - Kawahigashi Station - Imari Station - Higashiyamashiro Station - Sato Station - Kusuku Station - Naruishi Station - Kubara Station - Haze Station - Uranosaki Station - Fukushimaguchi Station
The main station is Imari Station.

Road
Expressways:
There are no expressway interchanges in Imari. The closest is the Nagasaki Expressway Takeo-Kitagata Interchange.
National highways:
Route 202
Route 204
Route 498
Prefectural roads:
Saga Prefectural Route 5 (Imari-Matsuura)
Saga Prefectural Route 32 (Hatagawachi-Chikushino)
Saga Prefectural Route 321 (Kurokawa-Matsushima)

Sea
The port of Imari is a medium size port which receives ocean ships of various types, including container ships, dry bulk ships, cruise ships...etc.  .

The port of Imari is also the location of the main shipyard of Nomura Shipbuilding Co. Ltd., an Osaka based shipbuilding and repair company

Pottery 
 Imari porcelain
 Ōkawachiyama, 'The Village of the Secret Kilns', used to be the home of the Nabeshima clan kilns, with masters such as Hatase Buemon and Sakaida Kakiemon.

The Imari Pear 
Imari is the largest Japanese pear producing center in western Japan. The cultivation of the Japanese pear from Imari, which originated in the Ōkawa area 100 years ago, has spread out to the Minamihata area and other areas of the city.  Today, they are produced over about 350 hectares of land, and their quantity of production was about 4800 tons per year as of 2007.

Ōkawa originally had little rice fields, but in 1906 this led the chairman of the Ōkawa Junior Chamber of Commerce, Takeji Fujita and 11 other people to spearhead the reclamation of forest lands and the cultivation of Japanese pears as a cash crop in Ōkawa. Since then the production and the crop acreage of Imari nashi have increased.  According to the latest municipal statistics, the production is the fifth and the acreage is the third in the nation.

The characteristics of Imari nashi are juiciness and crispness. Thanks to the adoption of light sensor systems for fruit sorting, only those which are of excellent quality can be selected and are shipped to Kantō, Kansai, and Kyūshū districts. Recently export to China has started and been promoted.

The main brands of Imari nashi are Kosui, Hosui, and Niitaka. The most produced is Kosui, but Hosui is the most popular brand of the three.

Festivals
The Imari Ton-Ten-Ton Festival is held annually for three days from October 22 to 24, beginning at the Imari Shrine in Imari City. The festival is well known as one of the three great fighting festivals of Japan.

People from Imari
Fujiko (actress)
Tatsuo Ikeda - avant-garde artist 
Sayuri Katayama - singer
Kyohei Maeyama - Footballer for Blaublitz Akita
Ryosuke Mizumachi - Basketball player for Akita Northern Happinets
Taichiro Morinaga - Morinaga & Co founder
Yōsuke Takasu - baseball player
Masayuki Tanaka - singer

References

External links

 Imari City official website 

Cities in Saga Prefecture
Port settlements in Japan
Populated coastal places in Japan